Palatinate-Zweibrücken-Birkenfeld was a state of the Holy Roman Empire based around Birkenfeld within the Upper Rhenish Circle. It was formed in 1569, after the partition of Palatine Zweibrücken and was reincorporated into that state in 1731.

History 
Palatinate-Zweibrücken-Birkenfeld was created in 1569 in the partition of the County Palatine of Zweibrücken after the death of Wolfgang for his youngest son Charles I. After Charles' death in 1600 his state was partitioned into itself and Palatinate-Birkenfeld-Bischweiler by his sons, with George William succeeding him in Birkenfeld. In 1635 the state was invaded and devastated during the Thirty Years' War, and in the same year decimated by an outbreak of the Plague. George William died in 1669 and was succeeded by his son Charles II Otto. Two years later he died, and with him the male line of the branch, so the state passed to Christian II of Palatinate-Birkenfeld-Bischweiler. Christian II died in 1717 and was succeeded by his son Christian III. In 1731 Christian inherited the Duchy of Zweibrücken and its seat in the Imperial Diet, and renamed his territories to Palatinate-Birkenfeld-Zweibrücken.

List of rulers

Notes 

House of Wittelsbach
Counties of the Holy Roman Empire
States and territories established in 1569
States and territories disestablished in 1731